The 1974–75 NBA season was the Detroit Pistons' 27th season in the NBA and 18th season in the city of Detroit.  The team played at Cobo Arena in downtown Detroit.

The Pistons finished with a 40–42 (.488) record, 3rd place in the Midwest Division.  The team was led guard Dave Bing (19.0 ppg, 7.7 apg, NBA All-Star), who held out over a contract dispute in the pre-season and center Bob Lanier (24.0 ppg, 12.0 rpg, NBA All-Star).  The steady improvement of the previous three seasons (26 to 40 to 52 wins) came to a halt, as injuries played a significant role in derailing the promising season.  In Sports Illustrated, the team was discussing Lanier playing through injury, "He’s our savior," says Rowe.  Our healer, says Adams.  Our leader, says Bing.  Listen to those guys, says Lanier. They think I’m Moses."

Detroit advanced to the 1975 NBA Playoffs, losing a first round series of the Western Conference playoffs 2–1 to the Seattle SuperSonics, dropping the deciding 3rd game 100–94 in Seattle, with each team winning at home in the series.   Lanier was limited in the series, averaging 20.3 ppg vs. his season average of 24.0 ppg, Howard Porter, picked up in a December trade with the Chicago Bulls, had an excellent series with 17.3 ppg, but the team could not overcome the stellar shooting of Downtown Freddie Brown, who averaged 23.7 ppg and Tom Burleson with a double-double of 22.3 ppg and 10.7 rpg.

Draft picks

Roster

Regular season

Season standings

z – clinched division title
y – clinched division title
x – clinched playoff spot

Record vs. opponents

Playoffs

|- align="center" bgcolor="#ffcccc"
| 1
| April 8
| @ Seattle
| L 77–90
| Howard Porter (21)
| Bob Lanier (14)
| Bob Lanier (9)
| Seattle Center Coliseum14,082
| 0–1
|- align="center" bgcolor="#ccffcc"
| 2
| April 10
| Seattle
| W 122–106
| Bing, Trapp (24)
| George Trapp (14)
| Dave Bing (11)
| Cobo Arena10,490
| 1–1
|- align="center" bgcolor="#ffcccc"
| 3
| April 12
| @ Seattle
| L 93–100
| Bob Lanier (29)
| Curtis Rowe (13)
| Dave Bing (10)
| Seattle Center Coliseum14,082
| 1–2
|-

References

Detroit
Detroit Pistons seasons
Detroit Pistons
Detroit Pistons